, also known as Takeo Suzuki, is a professional Go player.

Biography
Takeo served as the chief director of the Japanese go organization, the Nihon Ki-in, for many years up until his retirement in 2000. He is known for being the teacher of many strong players including Norimoto Yoda. Cho Sonjin, Tomomi Nakaonoda, and Kanda Ei. Takeo's other pupils include Arimura Hiroshi, Tominaga Takeshi, and Yamada Takuji.

References

External links
Takeo Ando's page at Nihon Ki-in

1938 births
Japanese Go players
Living people